David Young Murray (13 June 1925 – 20 October 2020) was a British water polo player. He competed at the 1948 Summer Olympics and the 1952 Summer Olympics.

References

1925 births
2020 deaths
British male water polo players
Olympic water polo players of Great Britain
Water polo players at the 1948 Summer Olympics
Water polo players at the 1952 Summer Olympics
Place of birth missing